The Prindle 18-2, or Prindle 18.2, is an American catamaran sailing dinghy that was designed as a racer and first built in 1983.

Production
The design was initially built by Prindle Catamarans, starting in 1983. After the product line was sold in about 1988, it was produced by Performance Catamarans in the United States, but it is now out of production.

The design replaced the 1977 Prindle 18 in manufacturer's product line.

Design
The Prindle 18-2 is a recreational sailboat, built predominantly of fiberglass. It has a fractional sloop rig with aluminum spars and a fully-battened mainsail. The dual symmetrical hulls have raked stems, plumb transoms, dual transom-hung, kick-up rudders controlled by a tiller and dual, retractable centerboards. The design displaces  and features a mesh trampoline between the hulls.

Operational history
In a review in Popular Mechanics in October 1987, writer Chris Caswell said, "under sail, the Prindle was balanced, responsive and easy to tack. Its knife-like bows sliced through Mission Bay waters during close reaches and the wake stretched out behind like twin white jet trails. Then, when flying a hull and powered by a sudden gust, it took off like a rocket. For sheer ecstasy of speed, you can't beat a well-designed catamaran."

See also
List of sailing boat types
List of multihulls

References

External links

Dinghies
Catamarans
1980s sailboat type designs
Two-person sailboats
Sailboat types built by Prindle Catamarans
Sailboat types built by Performance Catamarans